Jeremy White may refer to:

 Jeremy White (bass), English bass
 Jeremy White (cricketer) (born 1947), New Zealand cricketer
 Jeremy Allen White (born 1991), American film and television actor
 Jeremy Joyner White (1938–1990), professor at the University of Lagos

See also
Jerry White (disambiguation)